Anice Potter Terhune (October 27, 1873 – November 9, 1964) was an American author, composer, music educator, and church organist, who composed over 100 children's songs. She was known as "Annie," and sometimes published under the pseudonym Morris Stockton.

Terhune was born in Hampden, Massachusetts, to Elizabeth Morris Olmstead and John Potter. She married Albert Payson Terhune in 1901.

Terhune studied piano, organ, and music theory at the Cleveland Conservatory and in New York and Rotterdam, the Netherlands. She was fluent in French and Italian. Her teachers included Franklin Bassett, Edward Morris Bowman, and Louis Coenen.

Terhune wrote articles for women's magazines as well as books. Her book Home Musical Education for Children was syndicated throughout the United States. She belonged to the MacDowell Club and the Pen Women's League. She hosted lectures in her home, including one by Kate Sanborn.

Terhune's works were published by Arthur P. Schmidt, Clayton F. Summy, G. Schirmer Inc., John Church Co., and Oliver Ditson. Her publications included:

Books 

Across the Line (autobiography)

Ballade of Dead Ladies (memoir)

Chinese Child's Day

Eye of a Village

Home Musical Education for Children

Music Study for Children

Schirmer's Music Spelling Book

Opera 

Hero Nero

Woodland Princess

Piano 

Child's Kaleidoscope (16 pieces)

Country Sketches (12 pieces)

(The) Hill

Little Dream Horse

Romance in G Major

Songs of Summer (six pieces)

Suite for Piano (six pieces)

Vocal 

"Arrivederci: Italian Serenade"

Barnyard Ballads

"Bridal Song"

Children's Songs from Many Countries

Colonial Carols

Dutch Ditties

"Easter Morn"

"Exaltation"

"Faith: A Sacred Song"

"Gaelic Lullaby"

"In an Old Garden"

Our Very Own: a Songbook for Children

"Snow White Gull"

Song at Dusk (men's chorus)

Songs of Our Streets

"Syrian Woman's Lament" 

"When Summer Keeps the Vow of Spring"

References 

People from Hampden County, Massachusetts
American women composers
American writers
American writers about music
American women writers
American music educators
1873 births
1964 deaths
Pseudonyms